is a Japanese former Nippon Professional Baseball pitcher.

References 

1963 births
Living people
Baseball people from Tokyo 
Nippon Professional Baseball pitchers
Yakult Swallows players
Medalists at the 1984 Summer Olympics
Olympic baseball players of Japan
Olympic gold medalists for Japan
Japanese baseball coaches
Nippon Professional Baseball coaches